Richard Baret (died 1401), of Eastgate Street, Gloucester, was an English politician.

He was a Member (MP) of the Parliament of England for Gloucester in January 1377, 1378, January 1397, September 1397 and 1399.

References

Year of birth missing
1401 deaths
English MPs January 1377
English MPs 1378
English MPs January 1397
English MPs September 1397
English MPs 1399
14th-century English politicians
People from Gloucester